Martin Emmrich and Andreas Siljeström were the defending champions but decided not to participate.
Austin Krajicek and Tennys Sandgren defeated Greg Jones and Peter Polansky 1–6, 6–2, [10–8] in the final to win the title.

Seeds

Draw

Draw

References
 Main Draw

Tallahassee Tennis Challengerandnbsp;- Doubles
2013 Doubles